Andrzej Jańczy (born July 14, 1954) is a former Polish ice hockey player. He played for the Poland men's national ice hockey team at 1980 Winter Olympics in Lake Placid.

References

1954 births
Living people
Ice hockey players at the 1980 Winter Olympics
Olympic ice hockey players of Poland
People from Nowy Targ
Polish ice hockey left wingers
Sportspeople from Lesser Poland Voivodeship